Kabilan (born 16 May 1977) is an Indian lyricist, poet and actor who predominantly works in Tamil cinema. Born in the Indian coastal city of Pondicherry, he started writing lyrics for films and television in the early 2000s and gradually moved to acting as well. He won the Vijay Award for Best Lyricist for the song "Aaathangara Orathil" from Yaan (2014).

Filmography

Lyrics

Actor
Dasavathaaram (2008) – Assistant to Vincent Poovaragavan.

Television
 2003 Sorgam
 2004 Kanavarukkaga
 2005 Nimmathi
 2006 Kasthuri
 2007 Akka Thangai
 2007 Manjal Magimai
 2009 Mahalakshmi

References

External links
 

Tamil film poets
Indian lyricists
Indian male poets
Living people
21st-century Indian poets
Poets from Puducherry
21st-century Indian male writers
1977 births